Following the success of Benjamin Waterhouse Hawkins' life-sized concrete dinosaur models created for England's Crystal Palace for the Great Exhibition of 1851, in 1868 the Commissioners of Manhattan's newly created Central Park recruited the sculptor to create replicas of America's antediluvian giants for a proposed museum in Central Park. The museum was to have been known as the Paleozoic Museum (or Palaeozoic Museum), and foundations for the structure were laid by architect Frederick Law Olmsted at Central Park West and 63rd Street. Like Hyde Park's Crystal Palace, Hawkins' display was to be housed within a great iron frame and an arched glass roof. Surviving sketches and photographs show that Hawkins had planned an elaborate, if anachronistic, menagerie, mixing Mesozoic dinosaurs, plesiosaurs, and mosasaurs with extinct Cenozoic mammals.

However, unfortunately for Hawkins and future generations, the planned museum ran afoul of 19th Century New York's corrupt politics. After Hawkins spoke out publicly against "Boss" William Magear Tweed, vandals in the employ of Tweed broke into Hawkins' workshop on a spring day in 1871 and used sledge-hammers to reduce the seven finished models and their molds, as well as other materials, to rubble. The ruined sculptures were then buried somewhere near the southwestern corner of the park.

Afterwards, Hawkins went to Princeton University where he painted a number of restorations of America's Late Cretaceous environments (these have survived). He also managed to build one last dinosaur, a hadrosaur (Hadrosaurus foulkii). It was exhibited in Philadelphia and Washington D.C. as part of commemorations of the centenary of the Declaration of Independence in 1876. Though the hadrosaur sculpture was allowed to decay and crumble, some fragments have recently been located, all that now survives of Hawkins' ill-fated American dinosaur models.

Extant drawings by Hawkins, along with other records, indicate that the Paleozoic Museum would have included life-sized restorations of the theropod Laelaps (=Dryptosaurus), the hadrosaurid Hadrosaurus, the plesiosaur Elasmosaurus, and the mosasaur Mosasaurus (all from the Upper Cretaceous marls of New Jersey), along with glyptodont models, a pair of giant ground sloth, giant Pleistocene elk, mammoths, and extinct mammalian carnivores. Hawkins models from the Crystal Palace exhibition have survived and can be seen today in Sydenham Park.

References

Colbert, E.H. 1959. The Palaeozoic Museum in Central Park, or the Museum that Never Was. Curator 2:137-150.
Man, J. 1978. The Day of the Dinosaur. Bison Books Limited. London.
Rudwick, M. J. S. 1992. Scenes from Deep Time: Early Pictorial Representations of the Prehistoric World. The University of Chicago Press. Chicago.

Defunct museums in New York (state)
Prehistoric dinosaurs
Paleontology in the United States